The Love School (broadcast in the U.S. as The Brotherhood) is a BBC television drama series originally broadcast in 1975 about the Pre-Raphaelite Brotherhood, written by John Hale, Ray Lawler, Robin Chapman and John Prebble. It was directed by Piers Haggard, John Glenister and Robert Knights. It was shown during January and February 1975. It includes six episodes, each episode is 75 minutes in length.

The drama was a significant influence on the subsequent 2009 series Desperate Romantics. It was also the basis of the historical novel of the same name by Hale. It appears never to have been released on DVD anywhere in the world despite fans calling for such a release on IMDB and elsewhere. The DVD of the six episodes has now been released (8 April 2019) thanks to the efforts of the team at Simply Media TV. 2 discs in PAL format for region 2. run time 450 minutes.

Cast
Peter Egan as John Everett Millais
Ben Kingsley as Dante Gabriel Rossetti
Bernard Lloyd as William Holman Hunt
Gareth Hunt as Thomas Woolner
Patricia Quinn as Elizabeth Siddal
David Collings as John Ruskin
Anne Kidd as Effie Gray
Sheila White as Annie Miller
Kenneth Colley as Edward Burne-Jones
David Burke as William Morris
Kika Markham as Jane Morris
Malcolm Tierney as Ford Madox Brown

Episodes

Notes

External links

BBC television dramas
1975 British television series debuts
1975 British television series endings
1970s British drama television series
Costume drama television series
Period television series
Pre-Raphaelite Brotherhood in popular culture
Cultural depictions of 19th-century painters